Brighton Heights is a neighborhood in New York City's borough of Staten Island.

Silver Lake borders Brighton Heights on the south; however the name "Silver Lake" is applied to the community on the other side of the lake, which is actually a reservoir created in 1917.  The word "Heights" denotes the steep hill that rises from Tompkinsville to the east.  Victory Boulevard climbs this hill, and as a result the hill itself is often called Victory Hill.  Stapleton Heights is on the other side of Victory Hill from Brighton Heights, and north of Brighton Heights is St. George, the island's "downtown" section.

The northern section of Brighton Heights is sometimes referred to as Fort Hill, after a street located therein named Fort Hill Circle.

Brighton Heights has many large, older homes.

Points of interest
Points of interest include a Jewish Community Center and the Brighton Heights Reformed Church (NRHP).

Transportation
Brighton Heights is served by  local bus routes and the  express bus.

References

Neighborhoods in Staten Island
St. George, Staten Island